Roberto Kobeh González (born 18 October 1943 in Huixtla, Chiapas) is a Mexican engineer and politician, formerly the President of the Council of the International Civil Aviation Organization (ICAO) was in office from 1 August 2006 until 1 January 2014.

He graduated from Instituto Politécnico Nacional, in Mexico in 1965 and started his career in the same institution after his graduation as a professor of Electronic Engineering. He was assigned as director of SENEAM, the Mexican organization for air traffic control and aeronautical navigation and communications from 1978 to 1997.

In 1998, he became the representative of Mexico in ICAO, then Vice President of the organization. On 2 March 2006, he was elected to take over the presidency of the ICAO at the end of the term of the long-running president, Assad Kotaite starting 1 August 2006. Kotaite had been in the position for thirty years, from 1976 to 2006.

Kobeh González was re-elected on 19 November 2007 and again on 15 November 2010.

References

1943 births
Living people
Mexican people of Arab descent
International Civil Aviation Organization people
Mexican engineers
Politicians from Chiapas
Mexican officials of the United Nations
Instituto Politécnico Nacional alumni
Academic staff of the Instituto Politécnico Nacional